Víctor Hugo Rivera Chávez (born January 11, 1967) is a Peruvian football referee. He has been a referee for Peruvian Primera División since 1997 and earned his FIFA badge in 2001. Rivera is a university professor by profession.

External links
Bio at worldreferee.com

1967 births
Living people
Peruvian football referees
Copa América referees
Peruvian academics